Falsirhodobacter deserti is a Gram-negative, aerobic, halotolerant, heterotrophic and non-motile bacteria bacterium from the genus of Falsirhodobacter which has been isolated from the desert of Xinjiang in China.

References 

Rhodobacteraceae
Bacteria described in 2015